The 1962 Major League Baseball season was contested from April 9 to October 16, 1962.  The National League (NL) added two teams via expansion, the Houston Colt .45s and New York Mets. This marked the return of the NL to New York City after a four-year absence, although the Mets would lose 120 games and finish in last place. All major league teams now played 162-game schedules, which had been adopted by the American League (AL) the prior season, with each team facing the nine other clubs in the same league 18 times during the season.

The New York Yankees won the AL pennant, while the NL regular season concluded with both the San Francisco Giants and Los Angeles Dodgers having identical records, 101–61. A three-game tie-breaker series was held, which was won by the Giants, two games to one. The Yankees then defeated the Giants in the World Series, four games to three.

Awards and honors
Baseball Hall of Fame
Bob Feller
Bill McKechnie
Jackie Robinson
Edd Roush
Most Valuable Player
Mickey Mantle, New York Yankees, OF (AL)
Maury Wills, Los Angeles Dodgers, SS (NL)
Cy Young Award
Don Drysdale, Los Angeles Dodgers
Rookie of the Year
Tom Tresh, New York Yankees, SS (AL)
Ken Hubbs, Chicago Cubs, 2B (NL)

League leaders

Standings

American League

National League

  The San Francisco Giants defeated the Los Angeles Dodgers in a best-of-three tie-breaker series to earn the National League pennant.

Postseason

Bracket

Managers

American League

National League

Home field attendance

See also
1962 Nippon Professional Baseball season

References

External links
1962 Major League Baseball season schedule

 
Major League Baseball seasons